Jon MacLennan is a Los Angeles-based musician, composer, producer and music educator. MacLennan's session work includes playing guitar on Julian Lennon and Steven Tyler's song, "Someday", from Lennon's album, Everything Changes (2013), and backing vocals on Jamie Cullum's album, The Pursuit (2009). He's also played guitar on songs for Holly Knight, Mark Spiro and Tim Miner.  MacLennan's original song, "Fallin' Deeper", is featured in the Twentieth Century Fox film Marley & Me: The Puppy Years (2011) soundtrack.  MacLennan's published works include: three self-produced albums, two instructional music iBooks, Melodic Expressions: The Art of the Line (2012), Play Ukulele (2012) and hundreds of instructional workshop videos on his YouTube channel with over 1.48 million views.

Background 
MacLennan began his professional music career at 16 completing session work for Grammy Award-winning mixer Tom Weir. His first album, Suspicious Love (2006) was recorded at Weir's Studio City Sound in Studio City, CA. MacLennan also secured television work with 20th Century Fox Television and the Disney Channel during his teen years. MacLennan earned a bachelor's degree in Ethnomusicology from University of California, Los Angeles (UCLA) with emphasis in jazz guitar in 2010. His mentors include: Carl Verheyen, Tim Pierce, Kenny Burrell, Jimmy Wyble, Tamir Hendelman, Ron Anthony and Wolf Marshall, the author of Hal Leonard's Wolf Marshall Guitar Method and Power Studies.

Music education 
 Guitar instructor for the Los Angeles Pierce College Department of Music. 
 YouTube channel with over 250 videos and tutorials with over 1.4 million views.
 MacLennan is a regular contributor to GuitarControl's Play From the Heart section and also contributes to BluesGuitar.com
 When B. B. King died on May 14, 2015, The Los Angeles Times contacted MacLennan for expert insight into what is known as the "B.B. Box" in guitar instruction circles and commentary on King's style and legacy.
 Guitar World featured MacLennan's research and video-lesson into the Rolling Stones, "You Can't Always Get What You Want"; MacLennan proposes the song's intro is produced with a specifically tuned twelve-string acoustic guitar.

iBooks 
Melodic Expressions is an interactive instructional iBook for advanced guitar players. The iBook contains more than 90 pages of content pertaining to different musical genres and focuses on the "...language of the music," according to MacLennan. The iBook is divided into three sections, "Major", "Minor" and "Dominant" musical phrasing with genre specific core-elements, rather than formal scales and drilled exercises. Each page includes a slow and fast tempo playback with the lead guitar in the right speaker and the pad guitar in the left speaker. After-market iPad accessories are available to enable the guitarist to plugin to the iPad directly and play along with the left, right or both tracks.

 Melodic Expressions: The Art of the Line (2012)
 Play Ukulele (2012)

Instructional DVDs 
Jon has been creating instructional DVD guitar courses since 2012. Listed below are some of his top selling DVD courses.
 The Fasttrack Guitar System (2013)
 Play From the Heart (2013)
 Ukulele Secrets (2013)
 Blues Power (2014)
 Banjo Made Simple (2014)

Filmography

Soundtracks 
 Marley & Me: The Puppy Years – composer/performer
Soundtrack features MacLennan's single, "Fallin’ Deeper" – 20th Century Fox (2011)
  Perch (Surfing DVD) – composer/performer
Alex Knost, C.J. Nelson, Joel Tudor, Josh Farberow and Oliver Parker – Kylemacfilms (2009)

Television 
 Raising Hope – ukulele and guitar
20th Century Fox Television
 The Suite Life of Zack and Cody – guitarist
"What the Hey" season 2 episode 21 – Disney Channel (2006)

Discography 
Suspicious Love (2006)

Dreams (2011)

Songs from Box Canyon (2013)

References

External links 

1987 births
Living people
American session musicians
Musicians from Greater Los Angeles
21st-century American singers
American ukulele players
American banjoists
American mandolinists
21st-century American guitarists
Guitarists from California